Shivendra Bahadur Singh  is an Indian politician. He was elected to the Lok Sabha, the lower house of the Parliament of India from Rajnandgaon, Madhya Pradesh as a member of the Indian National Congress.

References

Indian National Congress politicians
Lok Sabha members from Madhya Pradesh
India MPs 1980–1984
India MPs 1984–1989
India MPs 1991–1996
Possibly living people
Year of birth missing
People from Rajnandgaon